The Europe/Africa Zone was one of the three zones of the regional Davis Cup competition in 1988.

In the Europe/Africa Zone there were two different tiers, called groups, in which teams competed against each other to advance to the upper tier. Winners in Group I were promoted to the following year's World Group. Teams who lost in the first round competed in the relegation play-offs, with winning teams remaining in Group I, whereas teams who lost their play-offs were relegated to the Europe/Africa Zone Group IIs in 1989.

Participating nations

Draw

First round

Belgium vs. Finland

Nigeria vs. Hungary

Senegal vs. Bulgaria

Romania vs. Portugal

Second round

Great Britain vs. Finland

Austria vs. Nigeria

Netherlands vs. Senegal

Portugal vs. Soviet Union

Relegation play-offs

Hungary vs. Belgium

Bulgaria vs. Romania

Third round

Austria vs. Great Britain

Soviet Union vs. Netherlands

References

External links
Davis Cup official website

Davis Cup Europe/Africa Zone
Europe Africa Zone Group I